Night Game is a 1989 American crime thriller filmed in Galveston and Houston, Texas. It stars Roy Scheider as a detective who must solve a series of murders. Released on September 15, 1989 by Epic Productions, the film was written by Spencer Eastman and directed by Peter Masterson.

Plot
A number of young women are found dead on or around the beaches of Galveston and the one thing they all have in common is that they were murdered when Houston Astros ace pitcher Silvio Baretto (an amalgamation of real-life pitchers Bob Knepper and Juan Agosto) pitches and wins a night game at the Astrodome. Additionally, each victim had her throat slashed by some sort of knife or hook.

Scheider plays former minor league baseball player turned Galveston homicide detective Mike Seaver. Seaver is a staunch Astros fan and is the only person on the case who begins to realize the coincidence of the deaths coming after Sil Barretto's night game wins in the Dome.

After 95 minutes of sleuthing, Seaver ultimately realizes that the murderer is a disgruntled former Astros pitcher named Floyd Epps. Epps had lost his pitching hand in a minor league bus accident and now wears a hook. He personally, if illogically, blames Sil Baretto for his misfortune and decides that his murders on the same night as Baretto's wins will steal the headlines from his former teammate.

The penultimate scene features Seaver shooting and killing Epps at a Galveston beach front restaurant. Epps has been attempting to murder Seaver's fiancee, Roxy, but the swings of his hook prove to be as wild as his mental state, and he fails. The final scene of the film features Sil Barretto walking off the mound before the start of a game in the Astrodome to lead the entire stadium in a standing ovation for the newly married Seaver and Roxy who are standing behind the dugout.

Cast
 Roy Scheider as Detective Mike Seaver
 Karen Young as Roxy
 Richard Bradford as Nelson
 Matt Carlson as Diddee
 Michelle Cochran as Cindy Baretto
 Alex Garcia as Sil Baretto
 Paul Gleason as Broussard
 Carlin Glynn as Alma
 Rex Linn as Epps
 Alex Morris as Gries
 Anthony Palmer as Mendoza
 Lane Smith as Witty
 Renee O'Connor as Lorraine Beasley
 James Black as Dale

Critical reception
Upon its release, Night Game was neither a critical nor a box office success. The New York Times review of the movie on September 16, 1989 read, "Maybe Roy Scheider should go back to chasing sharks. His career has taken a long, slow dive from his days as the harassed police chief in Jaws and the tortured Broadway director in All That Jazz. In fact, it seems to have hit bottom in Night Game." The review further stated, "It's hard to see what could have been done to liven up Night Game, short of having someone run into the Galveston Police Department yelling 'Shark!' Too bad no one does."

Notes
The movie was filmed entirely in Galveston and Houston and features such landmarks as the Galveston Seawall, Galveston Cotton Exchange (which is seen as the fictional Galveston Police headquarters), the San Luis Hotel, the Balinese Room (where Epps is killed), Galveston County Daily News compound (including some of the police station scenes depicting the detective office space), the former Broadway Theater, and the Gulf Freeway. The poster for the movie features a shot of Tiger Stadium in Detroit during the 1984 World Series instead of the Houston Astrodome. Roy Scheider portrayed a Detroit player in a prior baseball film, Tiger Town.

Behind the scenes
The movie was covered in the July 1989 Houston Astros program on pages 58 and 59. An author is not listed.

"Glenn Davis has proven repeatedly that he has a flair for the dramatic. With his consistent game-winning RBIs, one might say he almost performs on cue. And in August, he will prove it again, not only to Astros fans, but across America, when he belts a homer in the upcoming movie, Night Game. Parts of the movie were filmed in the Astrodome last year and director Peter Masterson says Davis proved to be the man he needed for a tricky plot twist. 'We needed an Astro to hit a home run and Davis was the one that hit it, so he got in the movie,' laughed Masterson in a call from his New York home."

"Night Game" was the first movie in years to be filmed in the Astrodome, joining "Brewster McCloud", a peculiar 1971 Robert Altman film largely shot in the stadium, "The Bad News Bears in Breaking Training", and "Murder at the World Series", an ABC-TV movie of the week that featured the Astros in a World Series before they had even won a division championship. This newest movie is also a murder mystery. Roy Scheider plays a Galveston detective who is cheering for the Astros in the midst of a tight pennant race. But one problem, he is assigned to track down a serial killer. And Scheider is discovering that the murders take place on the same night that Houston wins games.

"Night Game" was originally scripted to be set in San Francisco, but Masterson, a Houston native, who has also made "The Trip to Bountiful" and wrote "The Best Little Whorehouse in Texas", decided to bring the movie to Texas. 'It seemed more interesting to bring it to Houston. A lot of movies are made in San Francisco and not as many in Houston or Galveston,' the director said. 'I think it worked out better; it's a different kind of locale.' Critical to the movie was the availability of the Dome, he said. Filming during the games was limited to capturing crowd reaction, wide-angle shots of the teams and the occasional player at bat. Dodgers outfielder Mike Marshall was, like Davis, expected to hit a homer, Masterson said. But the director found that dingers in the Dome aren't all that common. 'We tried our best, but he didn't cooperate,' Masterson smiled, admitting that he had to resort to footage of a Marshall single and 'we cut real quick after the crack of the bat to crowd shots.'''Much more Dome footage will involve players no one is familiar with though. Masterson said former Astro Norm Miller, now a team executive, arranged for squads of amateur players to imitate the pros. 'After games ended, we got the field. We simulated some on-the-field stuff and got the close ups we needed,' Masterson recalled. 'We worked until dawn every night. As soon as it got too light, we'd have to quit.' In addition to present and past Astro stars, Houstonians will also recognize one more local figure in the movie. Bob Allen, the sports director at KTRK-TV Channel 13 plays the Astros' play-by-play broadcaster. Masterson said the anchorman 'did a really good job.'''

References

External links

Night Game trailer

Films directed by Peter Masterson
1989 films
1989 crime drama films
1980s sports films
American crime drama films
American baseball films
Films set in Houston
Films set in Texas
Films shot in Houston
Films shot in Texas
Galveston, Texas
Houston Astros
American police detective films
Films scored by Pino Donaggio
1980s English-language films
1980s American films